The War on Drugs is an American rock band from Philadelphia, Pennsylvania, formed in 2005. The band consists of Adam Granduciel (vocals, guitar), David Hartley (bass guitar), Robbie Bennett (keyboards), Charlie Hall (drums), Jon Natchez (saxophone, keyboards), Anthony LaMarca (guitar) and Eliza Hardy Jones (keyboards).

Founded by close collaborators Adam Granduciel and Kurt Vile, The War on Drugs released their debut studio album, Wagonwheel Blues, in 2008. Vile departed shortly after its release to focus on his solo career. The band's second studio album Slave Ambient was released in 2011 to favorable reviews and a lengthy tour.

The band's third album, Lost in the Dream, was released in 2014 following extensive touring and a period of loneliness and clinical depression for primary songwriter Granduciel. The album was released to widespread critical acclaim and increased exposure. Previous collaborator Hall joined the band as its full-time drummer during the recording process, with saxophonist Natchez and additional guitarist LaMarca accompanying the band for its world tour. Signing to Atlantic Records, the six-piece band released their fourth album, A Deeper Understanding, in 2017, which won the Grammy Award for Best Rock Album at the 60th Annual Grammy Awards. The band released their fifth album, I Don't Live Here Anymore, in 2021.

History

Beginnings and Wagonwheel Blues (2003–2008)
In 2003, frontman Adam Granduciel moved from Oakland, California, to Philadelphia, where he met Kurt Vile, who had also recently moved back to Philadelphia after living in Boston for two years. The duo subsequently began writing, recording and performing music together. Vile stated, "Adam was the first dude I met when I moved back to Philadelphia in 2003. We saw eye-to-eye on a lot of things. I was obsessed with Bob Dylan at the time, and we totally geeked-out on that. We started playing together in the early days and he would be in my band, The Violators. Then, eventually I played in The War On Drugs."

Granduciel and Vile began playing together as The War on Drugs in 2005. Regarding the band's name, Granduciel noted, "My friend Julian and I came up with it a few years ago over a couple bottles of red wine and a few typewriters when we were living in Oakland. We were writing a lot back then, working on a dictionary, and it just came out and we were like "hey, good band name" so eventually when I moved to Philadelphia and got a band together I used it. It was either that or The Rigatoni Danzas. I think we made the right choice. I always felt though that it was the kind of name I could record all sorts of different music under without any sort of predictability inherent in the name."

While Vile and Granduciel formed the backbone of the band, they had a number of accompanists early in the group's career, before finally settling on a lineup that added Charlie Hall as drummer/organist, Kyle Lloyd as drummer and Dave Hartley on bass. Granduciel had previously toured and recorded with The Capitol Years, and Vile has several solo albums. The group gave away its Barrel of Batteries EP for free early in 2008. Their debut LP for Secretly Canadian, Wagonwheel Blues, was released in 2008.

Following the album's release, and subsequent European tour, Vile departed from the band to focus on his solo career, stating, "I only went on the first European tour when their album came out, and then I basically left the band. I knew if I stuck with that, it would be all my time and my goal was to have my own musical career." Fellow Kurt Vile & the Violators bandmate Mike Zanghi joined the band at this time, with Vile noting, "Mike was my drummer first and then when The War On Drugs' first record came out I thought I was lending Mike to Adam for the European tour but then he just played with them all the time so I kind of had to like, while they were touring a lot, figure out my own thing."

Slave Ambient (2008–2012)
The lineup underwent several changes, and by the end of 2008, Kurt Vile, Charlie Hall, and Kyle Lloyd had all exited the group. At that time Granduciel and Hartley were joined by drummer Mike Zanghi, whom Granduciel also played with in Kurt Vile's backing band, the Violators.

After recording much of the band's forthcoming studio album, Slave Ambient, Zanghi departed from the band in 2010. Drummer Steven Urgo subsequently joined the band, with keyboardist Robbie Bennett also joining at around this time. Regarding Zanghi's exit, Granduciel noted: "I loved Mike, and I loved the sound of The Violators, but then he wasn't really the sound of my band. But you have things like friendship, and he's down to tour and he's a great guy, but it wasn't the sound of what this band was."

In 2012, Patrick Berkery replaced Urgo as the band's drummer.

Lost in the Dream (2013–2015)

On December 4, 2013 the band announced the upcoming release of its third studio album, Lost in the Dream (March 18, 2014). The band streamed the album in its entirety on NPR's First Listen site for a week before its release. Award winning alt-country rocker Ryan Adams tweeted that Lost in the Dream was a perfect album.

Lost in the Dream was featured as the Vinyl Me, Please record of the month in August 2014. The pressing was a limited edition pressing on mint green colored vinyl.

A Deeper Understanding (2015–2021)

In June 2015, The War on Drugs signed with Atlantic Records for a two-album deal.

On Record Store Day, April 22, 2017, The War on Drugs released their new single "Thinking of a Place". The single was produced by frontman Granduciel and Shawn Everett. April 28, 2017, The War on Drugs announced a fall 2017 tour in North America and Europe and that a new album was imminent. On June 1, 2017, a new song, "Holding On", was released, and it was announced that the album would be titled A Deeper Understanding and was released on August 25, 2017. "Holding On" was also used on the official soundtrack of EA Sports' FIFA 18.

The 2017 tour began in September, opening in the band's hometown, Philadelphia, and it concluded in November in Sweden.

A Deeper Understanding was nominated for the International Album of the Year award at the 2018 UK Americana Awards.

At the 60th Annual Grammy Awards, on January 28, 2018, A Deeper Understanding won the Grammy for Best Rock Album.

On October 6, 2020, The War on Drugs announced a live album titled Live Drugs, which was released on November 20, 2020.

I Don't Live Here Anymore (2021–present)
The War on Drugs released their fifth studio album, I Don't Live Here Anymore, on October 29, 2021. Along with the album announcement, the band also released a single and accompanying music video for the album's lead track, "Living Proof", along with a 2022 tour announcement. The album was released to widespread critical acclaim, placing highly on several end-of-year lists. For the album's accompanying tour, keyboardist Eliza Hardy Jones - who has previously played with bass guitarist Dave Hartley in his solo project, Nightlands - joined the band.

Musical style
The band has been described as indie rock, heartland rock and neo-psychedelia, as well as Americana. Their Dylan and Springsteen-influenced lyrical approach meets Tom Petty and Sonic Youth musically for a roots-soaked-synth-and-guitar approach to American rock and roll. Not only do they draw inspiration from artists like Bruce Springsteen, Talk Talk, and Granduciel's "favorite modern day band", Wilco, but they have inspired their own wave of guitar-forward, synth-layered indie rockers.

Side projects and collaborations

Kurt Vile & the Violators

Granduciel and Zanghi are both former members of founding guitarist Vile's backing band The Violators, with Granduciel noting, "There was never, despite what lazy journalists have assumed, any sort of falling out, or resentment" following Vile's departure from The War on Drugs. In 2011, Vile stated, "When my record came out, I assumed Adam would want to focus on The War On Drugs but he came with us in The Violators when we toured the States. The Violators became a unit, and although the cast does rotate, we've developed an even tighter unity and sound. Adam is an incredible guitar player these days and there is a certain feeling [between us] that nobody else can tap into. We don't really have to tell each other what to play, it just happens."

Sharon Van Etten
Both Hartley and Granduciel contributed to singer-songwriter Sharon Van Etten's fourth studio album, Are We There (2014). Hartley performs bass guitar on the entire album, with Granduciel contributing guitar on two tracks.

Sore Eros
Granduciel is currently producing the new Sore Eros album. They have been recording it in Philadelphia and Los Angeles on and off for the past several years.

Day of the Dead
In 2016, The War on Drugs contributed a cover of "Touch of Grey" for a Grateful Dead tribute album called Day of the Dead. The album was curated by The National's Aaron and Bryce Dessner. Granduciel had been curious about the Grateful Dead and other jam bands since he attended Phish concerts when he was younger.

Members

Current members
Adam Granduciel – lead vocals, lead guitar, harmonica, keyboards, samplers (2005–present)
David Hartley – bass guitar, rhythm guitar, backing vocals (2005–present)
Robbie Bennett – keyboards, piano, rhythm guitar (2010–present)
Charlie Hall – drums, organ (2008, 2013–present)
Jon Natchez – saxophone, keyboards (2014–present)
Anthony LaMarca – rhythm guitar, keyboards, backing vocals (2014–present)

Current touring musicians
Eliza Hardy Jones – keyboards, acoustic guitar, percussion, backing vocals (2021–present)

Former members
Kurt Vile – rhythm guitar, keyboards, backing vocals (2005–2009)
Kyle Lloyd – drums (2008)
Mike Zanghi – drums, percussion, sampler (2008–2010)
Steven Urgo – drums, percussion, sampler (2010–2012)
Patrick Berkery – drums, percussion (2012–2013)

Timeline

Discography

Albums

Studio albums

Live albums

EPs

Singles

Other charted songs

Notes

Awards and nominations

Grammy Awards

!
|-
| 2018
| A Deeper Understanding
| Best Rock Album
| 
| style="text-align:center;" |
|-
|-
| 2023
| Harmonia's Dream
| Best Rock Song
| 
| style="text-align:center;" |
|-
|}

Sweden GAFFA Awards
Delivered since 2010, the GAFFA Awards (Swedish: GAFFA Priset) are a Swedish award that rewards popular music awarded by the magazine of the same name.

!
|-
| 2018
| The War on Drugs
| Best Foreign Band
| 
| style="text-align:center;" |
|-
|}

References

External links
 Official website
 Tour dates on Label website

2005 establishments in Pennsylvania
Atlantic Records artists
Musical groups established in 2005
Grammy Award winners
Indie rock musical groups from Pennsylvania
Musical groups from Philadelphia
Secretly Canadian artists